Helmuth Aberle (born 10 June 1969) is a former Austrian footballer who played as a forward.

External links
 

1969 births
Living people
Association football forwards
Austrian footballers
SK Rapid Wien players
SV Stockerau players
FC Admira Wacker Mödling players
Floridsdorfer AC players
1. Wiener Neustädter SC players
SKN St. Pölten players
First Vienna FC players